Michael Terence Chernoff (May 13, 1946 — November 13, 2011) was a Canadian ice hockey left winger. He played one game in the National Hockey League for the Minnesota North Stars, on December 15, 1968, and 39 games in the WHA for the Vancouver Blazers during the 1973–74 and 1974–75 seasons.

Career statistics

Regular season and playoffs

See also
 List of players who played only one game in the NHL

External links
 

1946 births
2011 deaths
Canadian expatriate ice hockey players in the United States
Canadian ice hockey left wingers
Cleveland Barons (1937–1973) players
Dallas Black Hawks players
Ice hockey people from Saskatchewan
Iowa Stars (CHL) players
Jacksonville Barons players
Johnstown Jets players
Memphis South Stars players
Minnesota North Stars players
Moose Jaw Canucks players
Roanoke Valley Rebels (SHL) players
St. Louis Braves players
Sportspeople from Yorkton
Tulsa Oilers (1964–1984) players
Vancouver Blazers players